The General Atomics Mojave is an unmanned aerial vehicle (UAV) capable of short takeoff and landing (STOL), being developed by General Atomics Aeronautical Systems. First unveiled on December 9, 2021, General Atomics states that it is to fulfill the roles of reconnaissance, close air support and armed overwatch.

Design and development
Development on the Mojave began around 2018 or 2019. The initial objective was to create a drone that could perform vertical takeoff and landing (VTOL), but this was determined to be impractical as significant compromises in payload or endurance would need to be taken. Instead, development shifted to a STOL design that would preserve performance while needing less runway space. It features a configuration similar to that of the MQ-9 Reaper, with a low-mounted wing, bulbous nose and Y-tail. The engine, a Rolls-Royce M250 turboprop, is mounted in a pusher configuration. Two main things that set this aircraft apart from the rest of the Predator family are its wings and landing gear. The wings are enlarged, featuring "high-lift devices" including leading edge slats, double-slotted flaps and drooping ailerons. The landing gear is also more reinforced when compared to other UAVs, featuring wide bushwheel-style tires, used to assist on landing in rough terrain, and thick shock absorbers as well as more pronounced torque links. A key design feature of the Mojave is its transportability; it can be broken down and transported via a C-130 Hercules or similarly-sized aircraft. It can then be ready for a mission in around 1.5 hours with a four-person team.

The Mojave completed its first test flight in summer of 2021, and was formally unveiled by GA on December 9, 2021. It is being developed to fulfill the role of an unmanned combat aerial vehicle that can operate from more rugged terrain with a combat loadout, while also offering the option to be outfitted with various electronic systems to assist ground troops. Some of these roles include signal intelligence (SIGINT) and moving target indication, as well as use of synthetic-aperture radar and electro-optical sensors. It is able to take off from austere runways as little as 152 m (500 ft) in length. In a surveillance mode it can take off from a  runway and stay aloft for over 20 hours, and it can perform armed ISR from a 488 m (1,600 ft) runway carrying 12 Hellfire missiles for nine hours. At maximum, the Mojave can fly for 27 hours when taking off on a long runway with no payload and a full fuel load, or carry a  payload totaling 16 Hellfire missiles. The STOL capabilities of the Mojave have further lead to the proposition of it being used as a carrier aircraft for naval operations.

The Mojave is planned to be controlled using General Atomic's Scalable Command and Control (SC2) System, which is currently being developed for use on the MQ-1C Gray Eagle Extended Range (GE-ER), and likely will be able to operate from already-established General Atomics ground stations, such as the Certifiable Ground Control Station (CGCS) or Block 30 Ground Control Station. Use of the SC2 System will allow the operator to perform pre-flight, taxiing, takeoff, and landing operations on-site by a pilot.

Specifications

See also

References

External links
 General Atomics Mojave website

General Atomics aircraft
Unmanned aerial vehicles of the United States